Archegosauridae is a family of relatively large and long snouted temnospondyls that lived in the Permian period. They were fully aquatic animals, and were metabolically and physiologically more similar to fish than modern amphibians. The family has been divided into two subfamilies, the longer-snouted Platyoposaurinae and the shorter-snouted Melosaurinae.

Gallery

Platyoposaurinae

Melosaurinae

References

Ruta, M., Pisani, D., Lloyd, G. T. and Benton, M. J. 2007. A supertree of Temnospondyli: cladogenetic patterns in the most species-rich group of early tetrapods. Proceedings of the Royal Society B-Biological Sciences 274: 3087–3095.

Stereospondylomorphs
Permian temnospondyls
Cisuralian first appearances
Lopingian extinctions
Prehistoric amphibian families
Taxa named by Richard Lydekker